The World Group was the highest level of Davis Cup competition in 1992. The first-round losers went into the Davis Cup World Group Qualifying Round, and the winners progressed to the quarterfinals and were guaranteed a World Group spot for 1993.

France were the defending champions, but were eliminated in the quarterfinals.

The United States won the title, defeating Switzerland in the final, 3–1. The final was held at the Tarrant County Convention Center, Fort Worth, Texas, United States, from 4 to 6 December. It was the US team's 30th Davis Cup title overall.

Participating teams

Draw

First round

France vs. Great Britain

Netherlands vs. Switzerland

Brazil vs. Germany

Italy vs. Spain

Yugoslavia vs. Australia

Canada vs. Sweden

Czechoslovakia vs. Belgium

United States vs. Argentina

Quarterfinals

France vs. Switzerland

Brazil vs. Italy

Sweden vs. Australia

United States vs. Czechoslovakia

Semifinals

Switzerland vs. Brazil

United States vs. Sweden

Final

United States vs. Switzerland

References

External links
Davis Cup official website

World Group
Davis Cup World Group
Davis Cup